is a  mountain on the border of Yabu and Kami, Mikata, Hyogo, Japan. This mountain is one of Hyōgo 50, and a part of Hyonosen-Ushiroyama-Nagisan Quasi-National Park. The other name of this mountain is Mount Ishihara.

Outline 
Mount Myōken is a mountain on the eastern edge of the Chūgoku Mountains. Nikkōin temple is located at the base of the mountain. Originally, the temple was halfway up the mountain, but the Haibutsu-Kishaku Order issued during the Meiji-era forced the move.

Route

This mountain has major two routes to the top. One is from Ishihara Bus Stop of Tantō Bus. The other is from Mount Sobu. From Ishihara Bus Stop, it takes about three hours to the top.

Access 
 Ishihara Bus Stop of Tantō Bus

Gallery

References
 Official Home Page of the Geographical Survey Institute in Japan
 ‘Kansaishuhen no Yama 250’, Yama to Keikokusha Osakashikyoku

Mountains of Hyōgo Prefecture